Clubul Sportiv Municipal Olimpia Salonta, commonly known as Olimpia Salonta, is a Romanian professional football club based in Salonta, Romania, founded in 1911. Currently the team plays in Liga V.

History
CSM Olimpia Salonta was founded in 1911 as Nagyszalontai SC – in Romanian: CS Salonta – when Transylvania was still part of Austria-Hungary.

Over the years, the team from the second city of Bihor County had several names like: SC, CS, CSM, Steaua Roşie, Metalul, Stăruința, Recolta or Olimpia, but regardless of the name, the club has become a regular presence of the 3rd and 4th league.

The best period in the history of the club was in the 60's and 70's, when Olimpia, named at that time as Steaua Roșie, Metalul and mostly Recolta played for 17 consecutive seasons in the Liga III. In the 80's the team had an oscillating route, traveling between Liga III and Liga IV, but at the end of the 1984–85, Recolta obtained the best result in its long history, 2nd place in the Liga III at only 4 points behind Înfrățirea Oradea.

In 1988 Recolta relegated again in Liga IV, being the subject of a rebranding process, the team name was changed in Olimpia and the colours were changed also, from green and yellow to white and blue. In the 90's the team had some isolated appearances in the Liga III, but with no important performances. At the end of the 2003–04 season the team promoted back to Liga III after four years, but the team was disbanded due to the foundation of Liberty Salonta, club owned by Romanian businessman Marius Vizer, who also bought the stadium for 99 years and a place directly in Liga II from CSM Medgidia. Vizer built a strong football academy and modernized the stadium managing then the best period in the history of the football from Salonta, including a promotion to Liga I at the end of 2005–06 season, but Liberty never played there, after the place was sold to UTA Arad.

Olimpia Salonta was refounded in 2004 as CSM Olimpia Salonta and the colours were changed again, this time in white and red, inspired by the city's coat of arms, which has also become the logo of the club, but it played only at youth and amateur level, being all the time in the shadow of the new football club of Salonta. In 2009 Vizer gave up Liberty and the senior team was moved to Pomezeu. In 2013 the football academy was also dissolved and the people has begun to turn its face again to the old Olimpia, thing that gave a refresh to the club which promoted back to Liga IV at the end of 2012–13 Liga V season and also moved back to its original home, Stadionul Municipal, after 9 years on Stadionul Olimpia, a stadium without stands and a bad pitch. The club's main objective is the growth of young players and the discovery of new talents.

Stadium
The club plays its home matches on Stadionul Municipal from Salonta, with a capacity of 1,200 seats.

Honours

Leagues
Liga III:
Runners-up (1): 1984–85
Liga IV – Bihor County
Winners (5): 1983–84, 1989–90, 1992–93, 1998–99, 2003–04
Runners-up (1): 2002–03
Liga V – Bihor County
Winners (1): 2012–13

Cups
Cupa României
Round of 32 (1): 1957–58

Other performances 
 31 seasons in Liga III

Players

First team squad

Club officials

Board of directors

Current technical staff

Notable former players
  Elemér Kocsis
  Dorin Mihuț
  Lajos Sătmăreanu

References

External links
Official website

Football clubs in Bihor County
Salonta
Association football clubs established in 1911
Liga III clubs
Liga IV clubs
1911 establishments in Romania